Grevillea acrobotrya is a species of flowering plant in the family Proteaceae and is endemic to the southwest of Western Australia. It is a prickly, spreading to erect shrub with egg-shaped to trowel-shaped leaves with sharply-tipped lobes, and white to cream-coloured flowers with smaller leaves at the base.

Description

Taxonomy
Grevillea acrobotrya was first formally described in 1855 by Carl Meissner in Hooker's Journal of Botany and Kew Garden Miscellany based on material collected by James Drummond in the hinterland north of the Swan River. The specific epithet (acrobotrya) means "a bunch of grapes".

Distribution and habitat
This grevillea grows in heathland between Eneabba and Badgingarra in the Geraldton Sandplains and Swan Coastal Plain biogeographic regions of south-western Western Australia.

References

acrobotrya
Endemic flora of Western Australia
Eudicots of Western Australia
Proteales of Australia
Taxa named by Carl Meissner
Plants described in 1855